Louk Sorensen was the defending champion. He received the wild card, but he lost in the first round to future champion, Ruben Bemelmans.Bemelmans won in the final 7–6(5), 3–6, 6–3, against Stefano Galvani.

Seeds

Draw

Final four

Top half

Bottom half

External links
 Main Draw
 Qualifying Draw

Volkswagen Challenger - Singles
2009 Singles